Christopher Lamont (born 7 December 1982) is a British volleyball player. Born in Glasgow, Scotland, he competed for Great Britain in the men's tournament at the 2012 Summer Olympics.

References

Scottish men's volleyball players
Volleyball players at the 2012 Summer Olympics
Olympic volleyball players of Great Britain
1982 births
Living people
Sportspeople from Glasgow
Scottish expatriate sportspeople in France
Expatriate volleyball players in France